Detha, or Detho, is a Charan clan (gotra) in Sindh (Pakistan), Rajasthan, and Gujarat.

History 
Dethas were mainly centred in Sindh (Pakistan) in the areas of Tharparkar and Umerkot where Dethas were closely associated with the Sodha Rajputs. The largest jagir of Kharoda, located 3 miles north-east of Umerkot, was granted to Japhji Detha in 1225 AD (VS 1282) by the ruler of Umerkot, Rana Jaibhrama. Japhji Detha had aided the Rana in expansion of the kingdom.

Post-independence 
After independence and partition of India, many Hindu communities migrated to India but a substantial number remained in Pakistan. Due to clan exogamy, remaining Dethas of Sindh have to find matches with other Charan families in India for the marriage of their children.

Kuldevi 
Dethas worship Deval Mata as their Kuldevi (patron goddess) whose main-temple is located in Kharoda village of Sindh, Pakistan.

Notable people 

 Vijaydan Detha
 Chandi Dan Detha
 Swami Swarupdas

References 

Charan
Indian surnames
Pakistani names
Ethnic groups in Pakistan
Ethnic groups in India
Charan clans